Campo de Mirra (Spanish ) or El Camp de Mirra (Valencian ) is a municipality in the comarca of Alt Vinalopó in the Valencian Community, Spain.

References

Municipalities in the Province of Alicante
Alto Vinalopó